Occupational apartheid is the concept in occupational therapy that different individuals, groups and communities can be deprived of meaningful and purposeful activity through segregation due to social, political, economical factors and for social status reasons. 

Occupational apartheid may occur due to race, disability, age, gender, sexuality, religious preference, political preference, and creed. A war environment can also contribute to occupational apartheid in which the constraints of war prevent the people living in the midst of combat from accessing past occupations. Occupational therapists recognize that many people facing occupational apartheid do not have the opportunity to freely choose their occupations, and thus are disadvantaged. The health and wellbeing of these individuals, groups and communities is compromised through the deprivation of meaningful and purposeful activities. 

In the light of day to day existence, every individual should be of equal status, no matter what their economic, political, health or social status. Occupational apartheid explains the reality that some people may be occupationally more equal than others.

Groups that may experience occupational apartheid 
 Homeless adults
 Lesbian, gay, bisexual and transgender people
 Refugee and asylum seekers
 Individuals with disabilities 
 Religious groups
 Street children
 Survivors of domestic violence
 Women
 Incarcerated people
 Indigenous People
 Racial Minorities
 The working poor
 Freeters

See also
 Occupational injustice

References

Occupational therapy

Social inequality